The 21st Filipino Academy of Movie Arts and Sciences Awards Night was held in 1973 for the Outstanding Achievements for the year 1972. 

Kill the Pushers of JE Productions won the most coveted FAMAS Award for Best Picture award.  It was also the first time that the academy gave two best actress award to Vilma Santos for Dama de Noche and Boots Anson Roa for Tatay na si Erap. The FAMAS was rocked by a terrible scandal, because a tie was unheard of, the public dissented the vote. Therefore, for the next years, the FAMAS invited film critics to be members of its nominating and awarding committee.

Awards

Major Awards
Winners are listed first and highlighted with boldface.

Special Awardee

Dr. Ciriaco Santiago Memorial Award 
Dr. Jose R. Perez

References

External links
FAMAS Awards 

FAMAS Award
FAMAS
FAMAS